Egypt is an unincorporated community in northern Wharton County in the U.S. state of Texas.

History
Egypt was founded before any other settlement in Wharton County and was a part of Colorado County during the Republic of Texas period.

Egypt's 1827 name change from "Mercer's Crossing" came from the Bible, and originated from the text of Genesis 42:1-3.

References

Unincorporated communities in Wharton County, Texas
Unincorporated communities in Texas